Six Days or Forever? Tennessee v. John Thomas Scopes is a 1958 book on the Scopes Trial by Ray Ginger, first published in hardcover by Beacon Press and later reprinted in paperback by Oxford University Press. Ginger, later a professor of history at Brandeis, Wayne State University, and the University of Calgary and at the time a New York trade book editor, had written about Eugene Debs and the city of Chicago in the time of John Peter Altgeld before tackling the Scopes trial.  In the conclusion of Six Days or Forever? Ginger wrote his book had two purposes: First, getting "the facts straight" in order to correct "many mistakes in previous accounts of the episodes," believing his book "comes much closer than do those accounts to telling what actually occurred."  Second, Ginger "tried to view the Scopes trial in the broadest possible context" (242).

Ginger's primary reference sources were the published stenographic transcript and Leslie H. Allen's edited 1925 version, Bryan and Darrow at Dayton: The Record and Documents of the 'Bible Evolution Trial', along with the scrapbook files on the case of the ACLU and Kirtley F. Mather, one of the scientists who went to Dayton to testify on behalf of the Scopes defense.  Ginger made use of the available biographies of various participants as well as full-length studies of Fundamentalism and anti-evolution, histories of Tennessee, official records of the Scopes appeal, and books on various scientific and religious topics.  Ginger also pointed out that "in the interest of factual accuracy," John T. Scopes had read portions of the manuscript (242–48).  Reviews of the book praised Ginger's account of the trial as well as his assessment of the shortcomings of both Clarence Darrow and William Jennings Bryan.

Notes

Six Days or Forever?
Six Days or Forever?
Scopes Trial
Beacon Press books
Oxford University Press books
Books about trials